Bulldozer is an Italian heavy metal band from Milan originally active from 1980 to 1990. They have reunited as of 2008.

Biography 
Bulldozer formed in 1980 by bassist Dario Carria and guitarist Andy Panigada. They were joined by Erminio Galli on drums. They were forced to split up in 1981 due to national service commitments, but reformed in 1983 with Alberto Contini taking over bass and vocal duties and Don Andras playing drums. This line-up recorded the Fallen Angel demo (later to be re-issued as a 7"), their debut, The Day of Wrath, and their follow-up, The Final Separation.

The Day of Wrath was produced by Algy Ward of Tank fame (yet another bass-driven thunderous power trio band) and the influence can clearly be heard. The Final Separation signaled the abrupt interruption of the deal with Roadrunner Records, which failed to promote the album effectively and moreover selected a different image from the one suggested by the band as its cover art. The photo was deemed cartoonish and ineffective by the band and the whole affair brought to the signing of a new contract with Italian label Metalmagic, a sub-division of Discomagic.

Rob Cabrini was brought in on drums for IX (1987). This line-up recorded Neurodeliri (1988) and was captured live in Poland in 1990 for Alive... in Poland. Their final release was the posthumous Dance Got Sick! EP, which, although mainly put together by Contini as a "joke", enjoyed a huge success in Japan, prompting him to move to that country to work in music production.

In 2004, Bulldozer's song "Whiskey Time" was included in the Peaceville Records compilation Fenriz Presents... The Best of Old-School Black Metal, assembled by Darkthrone's drummer Fenriz. In November 2006, Bulldozer's five albums were collected together by Polish label Metal Mind Productions on the box set Regenerated in the Grave; the box set, hosting bonus tracks and a 32-page booklet, was limited to 2,000 copies.

In 2007, Italian power metallers Labyrinth, while touring Japan, hosted Contini onstage for a rendition of Bulldozer's classics. The crowd's ecstatic appreciation of the songs sparked the first thoughts of reunion. As of 2008, according to statements from both Alberto Contini and Andy Panigada, Bulldozer had reunited. Contini announced that they would start to work on a new album in August 2008. The album, titled Unexpected Fate, was released on 11 June 2009 and features Death Mechanism drummer Manu as Bulldozer's third member.

Band members

Current line-up 
 Alberto "A.C. Wild" Contini – vocals (1983–1990, 2008–present), bass (1984–1990, studio 2008–2011)
 Andy Panigada – guitars (1980–1981, 1983–1990, 2008–present)
 Emanuele "Manu" Collato – drums (2008–present)
 Ghiulz Borroni – guitars (2009–present)
 Giovanni "G.C." Contini – keyboard (2009–present)
 Alessandro Pozza – bass (2011–present)

Former members 
 Don Andras – drums (1984–1987)
 Dario Carria – vocals (1980–1981), bass (1980–1981, 1983–1984) (died 1988)
 Erminio Galli – drums (1980–1981, 1983–1984)
 Rob K. Cabrini – drums (1987–1990)

Timeline

Discography

Main albums 
 The Day of Wrath (1985, Roadrunner Records)
 The Final Separation (1986, Roadrunner)
 IX (1987, Discomagic Records)
 Neurodeliri (1988, Metal Master Records)
 Alive... in Poland (live, 1990, Metal Master)
 Unexpected Fate (2009, Scarlet Records)
 The Neurospirit Lives... (2012, Scarlet)
 The Exorcism (2014, Foad Records, re-recording of the 1984 original demo)

EPs 
 Dance Got Sick! (EP, 1992, Build Records)

Compilations 
 1983–1990: The Years of Wrath (1999, Sound Cave Records)
 Regenerated in the Grave (box set, 2006, Metal Mind Productions)

References

External links

Italian black metal musical groups
Italian thrash metal musical groups
Speed metal musical groups
Musical groups established in 1980
Musical groups disestablished in 1990
Musical groups reestablished in 2008
Italian musical trios
Musical groups from Milan
Metal Mind Productions artists
Roadrunner Records artists